The Andorran Athletics Federation (Catalan: Federació Andorrana d'Atletisme, FAA) is the governing body for the sport of athletics in Andorra. Former president was Judit Gómez Travesset. In 2012, Eduard Ricard García was elected new president, but in 2015 he resigned.

History 
FAA was founded in 1984, and was affiliated to the IAAF in 1989.

Presidents
Starting with the foundation of FAA in 1984, the following persons served as president:

Affiliations 
International Association of Athletics Federations (IAAF)
European Athletic Association (EAA)
Asociación Iberoamericana de Atletismo (AIA; Ibero-American Athletics Association)
Moreover, it is part of the following national organisations:
Andorran Olympic Committee (COA; Catalan: Comitè Olímpic Andorrà)

National records 
FAA maintains the Andorran records in athletics.

External links 
Official webpage (in Catalan)
FAA on Facebook

References 

Andorra
Athletics
National governing bodies for athletics
Sports organizations established in 1984
1984 establishments in Andorra